Häädemeeste is a municipality located in Pärnu County of Estonia.

Nigula Nature Reserve is partly located in Häädemeeste Parish.

Tahkuranna village of the municipality is known as the birthplace of Konstantin Päts, the first president of Estonia.

Settlements
Small borough
Häädemeeste
Villages
Arumetsa, Ikla, Jaagupi, Kabli, Krundiküla, Majaka, Massiaru, Metsapoole, Nepste, Orajõe, Papisilla, Penu, Pulgoja, Rannametsa, Reiu, Sooküla, Soometsa, Tahkuranna, Treimani, Urissaare, Uuemaa, Võidu.

Religion

Twinnings
 Hankasalmi, Finland

References

 
Municipalities of Estonia